Vacuum cooking may refer to:

Vacuum flask cooking
Sous-vide, a type of sealing vacuum cooking
Sousvide Supreme